Thomas More Universitas (Spanish: Universidad Thomas More (UTM)) is a private, Catholic university located in Managua, Nicaragua. It was founded in 1997 and is one of the 46 universities accredited by the National University Council (Consejo Nacional de Universidades, CNU). The founder of the university, Silvio De Franco, was a former Secretary of Education under President Violeta Chamorro's democratic government.

References

External links

Universities in Nicaragua
Educational institutions established in 2000
2000 establishments in Nicaragua